Daniyar Yuldashev (born 3 September 1996) is a Kazakhstani karateka. He won one of the bronze medals in the men's kumite +84 kg event at the 2018 Asian Games held in Jakarta, Indonesia. He is also a silver medalist in this event at the Asian Karate Championships.

He represented Kazakhstan at the 2020 Summer Olympics in Tokyo, Japan. He competed in the men's +75 kg event.

Career 

At the 2017 Asian Karate Championships held in Astana, Kazakhstan, he won the silver medal in the men's kumite 84 kg event. In the final, he lost against Masaya Ishizuka of Japan.

In June 2021, he competed at the World Olympic Qualification Tournament held in Paris, France hoping to qualify for the 2020 Summer Olympics in Tokyo, Japan. He did not qualify at this tournament but he was able to qualify via continental representation soon after.

In November 2021, he competed in the men's +84 kg event at the World Karate Championships held in Dubai, United Arab Emirates.

Achievements

References

External links 

 

Living people
1996 births
Place of birth missing (living people)
Kazakhstani male karateka
Karateka at the 2018 Asian Games
Medalists at the 2018 Asian Games
Asian Games medalists in karate
Asian Games bronze medalists for Kazakhstan
Karateka at the 2020 Summer Olympics
Olympic karateka of Kazakhstan
21st-century Kazakhstani people